Mnemic  was a Danish heavy metal band formed in Aalborg in 1998. The band personally described themselves as "Future Fusion Metal".

Mnemic have charted in the top 100 in Denmark with The Audio Injected Soul and were the first Danish metal band to open the Orange Stage at Roskilde Festival in 2004, one of Europe's biggest mainstream festivals. They have worked with Down and Fugees producer Warren Riker on the Passenger album, collaborated with Roy Z (Judas Priest and Bruce Dickinson producer), and were featured on the soundtracks of Alone in the Dark, Echo and Nordkraft films.

History

Formation and Mechanical Spin Phenomena

Mnemic (the Greek word for "memory" and an acronym for 'Mainly Neurotic Energy Modifying Instant Creation') was formed in the town of Aalborg, Denmark in 1998, by vocalist Mark Bai, guitarist Mircea Gabriel Eftemie, guitarist Rune Stigart, bassist Mikkel Larsen and ex-Invocator session drummer Brian Rasmussen. Some times later, Bai left the band to pursue other interests and was replaced by Michael Bogballe. The band were signed to Nuclear Blast Records, and produced their first album Mechanical Spin Phenomena in 2003 with producer Tue Madsen. After the recording of the album, Larsen was replaced by ex-Grope bassist Tomas "OBeast" Koefoed.

The band toured with Disbelief, Darkane, Mystic Prophecy and Death Angel in Europe, and alongside Machine Head in Germany.

The Audio Injected Soul
In 2004, Mnemic recorded their second album The Audio Injected Soul, at AntFarm Studios in Århus, Denmark with Madsen. The album was notable for including a cover version of Duran Duran's "Wild Boys", and also for being the first album in the world to be recorded using binaural recording technology. This style of recording allowed enhanced audio for listeners with special head sets. The album debuted at 97 in the national Danish album charts.

The album spawned two music videos, "Deathbox" (directed by Patric Ulleaus), which was filmed at the Revolver Studios in Gothenburg, and "Door 2.12", which was filmed in Berlin.

Vocalist change
In 2005, vocalist Bøgballe left the band and was replaced by former Transport League and B-Thong vocalist Tony Jelencovich.  Jelencovich filled in for the band's North American tour with Meshuggah, but was subsequently replaced in April 2006 by ex-Scarve vocalist Guillaume Bideau.

Passenger
Mnemic's third studio album, titled Passenger, was produced by Christian Olde Wolbers of Fear Factory, featuring artwork by Asterik Studios, and guest vocals by Jeff Walker (of Carcass and Brujeria) and Shane Embury (of Napalm Death and Brujeria). The album spawned a music video for the song "Meaningless", directed by Patric Ullaeus of the Revolver Film company.

The album was released in February 2007, with the Japanese version containing a bonus track, titled "Zero Synchronized".

Sons of the System
Mnemic's fourth album Sons of the System was distributed via Nuclear Blast Records, and released in Europe on 15 January 2010 and in North America on 26 January 2010. It was recorded in the band's own studio, with producer Tue Madsen (who worked with the band on previous releases Mechanical Spin Phenomena and The Audio Injected Soul).

Sons of the System includes 11 tracks, plus three bonus tracks (including a worldwide iTunes exclusive and a remix available in North America only).
The band describes the production of the album as "Very eclectic, very diverse, and nothing that you would imagine coming from a band like us. Let's just say it has become more theatrical, more electronic, and just more catchy, as we have put all our focus on writing good songs and not being afraid of experimenting." In 2011, longtime members of Mnemic guitarist Rune Stigart, bassist Tomas Cowan Koefoed and drummer Brian Rasmussen left the band, leaving Mircea Gabriel Eftemie as the only original founding member.

Mnemesis
The band's fifth album, Mnemesis, was released in June 2012, Their first album with new members guitarist Victor-Ray Salomonsen Ronander, bassist Simone Bertozzi and drummer Brian Larsen. In November 2013 the band announced that guitarist Victor-Ray Salomonsen Ronander had chosen to leave the band and they will play one final show with him in Copenhagen on 28 November 2013, before taking a break. In 2014, the band disbanded, though no official announcements were ever made.

Members

Current 
 Mircea Gabriel Eftemie – guitar, keyboards (1998–2013)
 Simone Bertozzi – bass (2011–2013)
 Brian Larsen – drums (2011–2013)

Former 

 Guillaume Bideau – vocals (2006–2013, died 2022)
 Michael Bøgballe – vocals (2001–2005)
 Mikkel Larsen – bass (1998–2003)
 Mark Bai – vocals (1998–2001)
 Tomas "OBeast" Cowan Koefoed – bass (2003–2011)
 Brian "Brylle" Rasmussen – drums (1998–2011)
 Rune Stigart – guitar, keyboards (1998–2011)
 Victor-Ray Salomonsen Ronander – guitar, keyboards, programming (2011–2013)

Touring members 
 Tony Jelencovich – vocals (2005–2006)
 Victor-Ray Salomonsen Ronander – guitar (2009–2010)
 Brian Larsen – drums (2011)

Timeline

Discography

Studio albums

Singles 
 "Ghost" (2003)
 "Liquid" (2003)
 "Deathbox" (2004)
 "Door 2.12" (2004)
 "Meaningless" (2007)
 "Meaningless / What's Left" (2007)
 "Diesel Uterus" (2010)
 "I've Been You" (2012)

References

External links
Official website
Twitter
Flickr
 
 

Danish progressive metal musical groups
Danish thrash metal musical groups
Danish industrial metal musical groups
Musical groups established in 1998
Musical groups disestablished in 2013
1998 establishments in Denmark
2013 disestablishments in Denmark
Musical quintets
Nu metal musical groups
Nuclear Blast artists